Auctorem fidei is a papal bull issued by Pius VI on 28 August, 1794 to condemn the tendency towards Gallicanism and Jansenist-tinged reforms of the Synod of Pistoia (1786).

The bull catalogued and condemned 85 articles of the Synod of Pistoia. After the bull's publication, Scipione de' Ricci submitted. In 1805, he took occasion of the presence of Pius VII in Florence on the latter's way to Rome from his exile in France to ask in person for pardon amid reconciliation.

The document has been cited as a source of doctrinal orthodoxy when later popes were called to combat doctrinal errors in the 19th and 20th centuries. It is mentioned in Indulgentiarum doctrina, Quo graviora, Commissum divinitus, Mysterium fidei and Pascendi dominici gregis.

References

Sources

External links

18th-century papal bulls
Documents of Pope Pius VI
1794 in Christianity